Chitonomyces is a genus of fungi in the family Laboulbeniaceae. The genus contain 98 species.

References

External links 
 Chitonomyces at Index Fungorum
 Chitonomyces at gbif.org

Laboulbeniaceae
Laboulbeniales genera